Dubber Side of the Moon is the second dub reggae tribute to the Pink Floyd album, The Dark Side of the Moon, by New York-based band Easy Star All-Stars.  The album features bass-heavy dub remixes by prominent dub producers of its predecessor, Easy Star Records' 2003 release Dub Side of the Moon.  Dubber Side of the Moon debuted at #2 on the Billboard Reggae charts.

Reviews

"Great effort. Great remixes. Great album." 
- Music News 

"This second re-imagining rightly uses its predecessor as a launch pad while keeping the Floyd's uniquely ambivalent overall mood, but allows the re-mixers ideas to take flight."
- Angus Taylor, BBC Music 

"A highly desirable set of beatmakers and dub masters are handling the remixes here..."
- David Jeffries, All Music

Track listing
"Speak to Me/Breathe (In The Air)" (Dubmatix Remix)
"On the Run" (10 Ft. Ganga Plant Remix)
"Time" (Groove Corporation Remix)
"The Great Gig in the Sky" (Dubphonic Remix)
"Money" (The Alchemist Remix)
"Us and Them" (Dreadzone Remix)
"Any Colour You Like" (Kalbata Remix)
"Brain Damage" (Adrian Sherwood & Jazzwad Remix)
"Eclipse" (Victor Rice Remix)
Bonus tracks
"Step It Pon The Rastaman Scene" (Border Crossing Remix)
"Money" (Mad Professor Remix)
"Time Version" (Michael G Easy Star All-Stars Remix)
"On The Run" (J.Viewz Remix)

References

External links 
  Easy Star Records

2010 albums
Easy Star All-Stars albums
Tributes to The Dark Side of the Moon
Easy Star Records albums
Albums produced by Michael Goldwasser